Marcos Alexandre Souza Soares (born 30 July 1975) is a Brazilian football manager and former player who played as a central defender. He is the current manager of the Saudi Arabia national under-19 team.

Playing career
Known as Ditão during his playing days, Rio de Janeiro-born Soares began his senior career with hometown side America-RJ. After playing for Mesquita and Serrano in his native state, he moved to Atlético Alagoinhas in 2000.

In July 2001, Soares moved abroad and joined Segunda Liga side U.D. Oliveirense, but could not prevent the club's relegation in the campaign. After another campaign in the club, he subsequently represented S.C. Espinho and Oliveira do Bairro S.C. before switching to Thailand's Terengganu FC in 2005.

In 2006, after a short stint at Guangzhou FC, Soares returned to his home country after signing for Brazlândia. He agreed to a deal with Dom Pedro II for the 2007 season, and subsequently retired with the club due to injuries.

Managerial career
Shortly after retiring, Soares became an assistant manager at Brasiliense. In 2009, he started to manage the club's under-20 squad, being also an interim in the 2010 campaign. 

After being in charge of Santa Maria's under-20s in 2010, Soares left the club in February 2011 to become the interim manager of Atlético Ceilandense. In March, he returned to Brasiliense as a replacement to sacked Reinaldo Gueldini, and won the year's Campeonato Brasiliense. Confirmed as manager for the 2011 Série C, he was sacked in September and replaced by Argel Fucks.

Soares was named manager of Sobradinho on 13 January 2012. After leaving the club, he toured through some European clubs before returning to Brazil. In July 2013, he took over Brasília.

On 9 February 2014, despite being unbeaten in the season, Soares was sacked by Brasília. He subsequently returned to Brasiliense for a third spell, but was also dismissed on 23 October.

On 17 December 2014, Soares agreed to become Anápolis manager for the upcoming season. After leading the club in their promotion to the first division of Campeonato Goiano, he was named manager of Santos' under-20 squad.

Soares was relieved of his duties from Peixe in February 2017, and became Dyego Coelho's assistant at Corinthians' under-20 side the following month. On 14 December 2018, he was appointed manager of the under-20 team of Botafogo.

Soares was sacked by Bota on 10 October 2020, and took over Maringá the following 4 January.

Honours

Manager
Brasiliense
Campeonato Brasiliense: 2011

References

External links

Futebol de Goyaz profile 

1975 births
Living people
Footballers from Rio de Janeiro (city)
Brazilian footballers
Association football defenders
America Football Club (RJ) players
Mesquita Futebol Clube players
Serrano Football Club players
Alagoinhas Atlético Clube players
Liga Portugal 2 players
U.D. Oliveirense players
S.C. Espinho players
Terengganu FC players
Guangzhou F.C. players
Brazilian expatriate footballers
Brazilian expatriate sportspeople in Portugal
Brazilian expatriate sportspeople in Thailand
Brazilian expatriate sportspeople in China
Expatriate footballers in Portugal
Expatriate footballers in Thailand
Expatriate footballers in China
Brazilian football managers
Campeonato Brasileiro Série C managers
Campeonato Brasileiro Série D managers
Brasiliense Futebol Clube managers
Sobradinho Esporte Clube managers
Brasília Futebol Clube managers
Anápolis Futebol Clube managers
Santos FC non-playing staff